Bela Bahadurpur is a village in Sitamarhi district of Bihar, India.

References

Villages in Sitamarhi district